This is a list of the weekly Canadian RPM magazine number one Top Singles chart of 1979.

See also
1979 in music

Hot 100 number-one hits of 1979 (United States) by Billboard magazine
Cashbox Top 100 number-one singles of 1979 by Cash Box
List of Canadian number-one albums of 1979

References
Notes

§ – first issue of following year was released 12 January 1980.

Citations

External links
 Read about RPM Magazine at the AV Trust
 Search RPM charts here at Library and Archives Canada

 
1979 record charts
1979